Theta Arae, Latinized from θ Arae, is the Bayer designation for a star in the constellation Ara. It has an apparent visual magnitude of +3.67, which is bright enough to be seen with the naked eye. Based upon an annual parallax shift of 4.01 mas, Theta Arae is  distant from the Earth.

This is a supergiant star with a stellar classification of B2 Ib. It has nearly nine times the mass of the Sun and is over 20 times the Sun's radius. The outer atmosphere of this star has an effective temperature of 17,231 K; much hotter than the surface of the Sun. At this heat, the star shines with the characteristic blue-white hue of a B-type star.

References

External links
 Simbad
 Image Theta Arae

165024
Arae, Theta
Ara (constellation)
B-type supergiants
088714
6743
Durchmusterung objects